Golden Dawn Girls is a political documentary film on the background of the neo-Nazi organization Golden Dawn, directed by the Norwegian Håvard Bustnes.

Plot 
The documentary delves into the far-right organization, something unprecedented to date, narrating the events that have taken place since the creation of the Greek ultra-right party through the gaze of the women who have surrounded the visible faces from the party that, even being in the background due to the deeply patriarchal role of the party, their strong character made the whole party know them. After the arrests of the male leaders, their voice took power within the organization, also influenced by the role of martyrs, shouting "blood, honor, Golden Dawn".

To explain different points of view, the documentary follows three different generations with a very different past, such Dafni, who became a member of some left-wing parties: "When I was young, I had totally different political ideas. I was a member of PASOK many years. With all the ideals that inspire young people: democracy, freedom and those beautiful ideas that you eventually discover to be a lie." The other two protagonists are Jenny, known for her hate speech, and Urania, daughter of the organization's leader, and who has the strongest voice in hate speech and violence, not in vain, she was arrested for beating up a Pakistani in 2012.

Main characters 

 Dafni, mother of Panayiotis Iliopoulos, was a submarine engineer, hospital director and a socialist militant.
 Jenny, known as "wife of hate", spouse of deputy Giorgos Germenis, imprisoned in 2013.
 Urania, daughter of the organization's leader, Nikolaos Michaloliakos, who was also imprisoned.

Reception 
The documentary, directed by Norwegian Håvard Bustnes, was co-produced by Norway, Denmark and Finland. Filming began in 2013, when the Norwegian director went to Greece with the aim of reporting the imprisonment of 13 Golden Dawn deputies. The premiere was during the International Documentary Film Festival Amsterdam (IDFA). At the beginning of 2018, it began to be released in Sweden and Denmark, and since April it reached theaters in Spain in its original version with subtitles. Ignacio Escolar, journalist and editor of El Diario, highlighted "how they construct a discourse in which their men are heroes of the country", while Variety magazine highlighted the "disturbing and tremendously convincing study by Norwegian director Håvard Bustnes on the rapid rise of neo-Nazism in contemporary Greece."

See also 

 Far-right politics

References

External links 
 

Norwegian documentary films
Documentary films about crime
Documentary films about Greece
2017 documentary films
Neo-Nazism in Greece
2017 films
Danish documentary films
Finnish documentary films
Films about neo-Nazism